The Aemoi is a river of East New Britain, Papua New Guinea. It flows into Open Bay on the north-west coast, to the south of Tonganda.

References

Rivers of New Britain
East New Britain Province